Michelle Saum Schofield was an American woman who lived in central Florida with her husband Leo. She did not return home from her job at a restaurant in Lakeland on February 24, 1987. Her body was found three days later in a canal in Bone Valley. She had been stabbed multiple times. Leo was convicted of her murder in 1988 and has been in prison ever since; however, he has always maintained his innocence. 

A podcast about the murder called Bone Valley, created by writer Gilbert King for Lava for Good, was released in late 2022. The case was also featured on an episode of ABC's 20/20 called Last seen in Lakeland that aired on September 23, 2022.

References 

1987 murders in the United States
Female murder victims
People murdered in Florida